Pat Carroll (born November 11, 1985 in Springfield, Virginia) is an American soccer player who last played for Real Maryland Monarchs in the USL Second Division.

Career

College
Carroll played college soccer at West Virginia University from 2004 to 2007.

Professional
Carroll was signed to a developmental contract by D.C. United on March 1, 2008, and made his full professional debut for July 1, 2008, as a second half substitute in a US Open Cup third round game against Rochester Rhinos. He made his Major League Soccer debut as a starting defender on July 24, 2008 in a 2-0 loss to the Houston Dynamo, and went on to total 186 in four games in his debut year. He also saw action in nine games with United's reserves in the MLS Reserve Division, making one assist and clocking 666 minutes.

Carroll was released by D.C. United in December 2008, and subsequently signed for the Real Maryland Monarchs of the USL Second Division in April, 2009.

Personal
Carroll is the brother of fellow professional soccer players Jeff Carroll and Brian Carroll, all of whom played with him at D.C. United.

References

External links
Real Maryland Monarchs bio
MLS player profile

1985 births
Living people
American soccer players
D.C. United players
Association football defenders
Sportspeople from Fairfax County, Virginia
Real Maryland F.C. players
Major League Soccer players
USL Second Division players
West Virginia Mountaineers men's soccer players
Soccer players from Virginia